Khapgah (also known as Ḩapgah-e Shīān and Khapgah Shī’ān) is a village in Homeyl Rural District, Homeyl District, Eslamabad-e Gharb County, Kermanshah Province, Iran. At the 2006 census, its population was 478, in 106 families.

References 

Populated places in Eslamabad-e Gharb County